DDRE may refer to:

 Danish Defence Research Establishment of the Military of Denmark. 
 Director of Defense Research and Engineering, under the Office of the Secretary of Defense, United States.
 Dance Dance Revolution Extreme, a video game for the PlayStation 2